SH High School may refer to:
 Shawnee Heights High School
 Spring Hill High School (Arkansas)
 Spring Hill High School (Texas)